Charlotte County Public Schools (CCPS) operates all public K-12 schools in Charlotte County, Florida. It covers Port Charlotte, Punta Gorda, Englewood, Rotonda West, Babcock Ranch, and surrounding areas. It operates ten elementary schools, four middle schools, three high schools, and six specialty education centers.

History 

The roots of the district are traced back to 1888 when the first school building in the area was built on the corner of Marion Street and Harvey Street in Punta Gorda. At the time, African Americans in Charlotte County were not allowed to attend a white school. The first black school was built in 1893; black students were not introduced into the white schools in Charlotte County until 1964. Accelerated growth in the community beginning in 1950 resulted in the rapid expansion of the school district. New, larger schools started popping up all over the county much more rapidly than before.

Notable staff members

Port Charlotte High School 
 Doug Dunakey, former professional golfer in PGA; became golf coach after retirement
 Mark Ivey, college football coach; previously coached for PCHS

County-wide 
 Sallie Jones, first superintendent of any school system in Florida.

Notable alumni

Charlotte High School 
 Burton Lawless (class of 1970), professional football player in NFL
 Jeff Corsaletti (class of 2001), professional baseball player in MiLB
 Matthew LaPorta (class of 2003), professional baseball player in MLB; 2008 Summer Olympian
 Tommy Murphy, professional baseball player in MLB

Port Charlotte High School 
 Chris Demakes and Vinnie Fiorello, professional musicians with Less Than Jake, a ska punk band.
 John Hall (class of 1992), professional football player in NFL
 Anthony Hargrove (class of 2001), professional football player in NFL
 Asher Levine (class of 2006), fashion designer
 David Holmberg (class of 2009), professional baseball pitcher in MLB

Lemon Bay High School 

 J. D. Barker (class of 1989), author

 Denise Amber Lee (class of 2004), kidnapping and murder victim

List of schools

Elementary schools 

Deep Creek Elementary School is a K-5 school located in Port Charlotte with 720 students. Their principal is James Vernon. Their mascot is the Bear Cub. Their school colors are blue and gold. It is classified as an "A" school.
East Elementary School is K-5 school located in Punta Gorda with 500 students. Their principal is Dr. Lori Carr. Their mascot is the Eagle. Their school colors are red and white. It has earned an "A" rating and has been considered an AYP school for three years.
Kingsway Elementary School is a K-5 school located in Port Charlotte with 780 students. Their principal is Lori Davis. Their mascot is the Cougar. Their school colors are blue and white. It is classified as an "A" school.
Liberty Elementary School is a K-5 school located in Port Charlotte with 780 students. Their principal is Thomas Gifford. Their mascot is the Patriot. Their colors are red, white, and blue. It is classified as an "A" school.
Meadow Park Elementary School is a K-5 school located in Port Charlotte with 764 students. Their principal is Asena Mott. Their mascot is the Alligator. Their colors are green and gold. It has been considered an "A" school for five years. It has earned the "You Make a Difference" award.
Myakka River Elementary School is a K-5 school located in Port Charlotte with 660 students. Their principal is Grace Shepard. Their mascot is the Manatee. It is classified as an "A" school. It was one of 99 schools nationwide recognized by Richard W. Riley as a Title 1 school for offering outstanding programs for disadvantaged students.
Neil Armstrong Elementary School is a K-5 school located in Port Charlotte with 557 students. Their principal is Angie Taillon. Their mascot is the Astro. Their colors are red and white. It enforces a school uniform policy. It is classified as an "A" school. It is a distinguished school classified as AYP.
Peace River Elementary School is a K-5 school located in Port Charlotte with 475 students. Their principal is Bertie Alvarez. Their mascot is the Panther. It enforces a school uniform policy.  It is classified as an "A" school.
Sallie Jones Elementary School is a K-5 school located in Punta Gorda with 700 students. Their principal is Carmel Kisiday. Their mascot is the Tiger. Their colors are hunter green, red, navy blue, white and khaki. It enforces a school uniform policy. It is classified as an "A" school.
Vineland Elementary School is a K-5 school located in Rotonda with 900 students. Their principal is Laura C. Blunier. Their mascot is the Great Blue Heron. Their colors are blue and white. It is classified as an "A" school.

Middle schools 

L.A. Ainger Middle School is a school located in Rotonda West with 1115 students. Their principal is Jeffrey Harvey. Their mascot is the Cougar. It's been classified as an "A" school for seven years.
Murdock Middle School is a middle school located in Port Charlotte with 950 students. It was beginning to be constructed in 1986 and open for its first official school year in 1988. Their principal is Lyman Welton. Their mascot is the Mariner. The school has earned the status of a Red Carpet School and a Blue Ribbon School. It is also classified as an "A" school.
Port Charlotte Middle School is a middle school located in Port Charlotte with 1030 students. Their principal is Demetrius Revelas. Their mascot is the Terrier. It is classified as an "A" school.
Punta Gorda Middle School is a middle school located in Punta Gorda with 1050 students. Their principal is Justina Dionisio. Their mascot is the Eagle. Their colors are red and blue.

High schools 

Port Charlotte High School is a high school located in Port Charlotte with 2,250 students. Their mascot is the Pirate. Their colors are red, white, and black.
Lemon Bay High School is a high school located in Englewood with 1,560 students. Their mascot is the Manta Ray. Their colors are navy blue and orange.
Charlotte High School is a high school located in Punta Gorda with 2,006 students. Their mascot is the Tarpon. Their colors are blue and gold.

Florida SouthWestern Collegiate High School

References

External links 

Florida Department of Education

School districts in Florida
Educational institutions established in 1888
Public Schools
1888 establishments in Florida